Michael Ranseder (born 7 April 1986 in Antiesenhofen) is an Austrian motorcycle racer who participates in motorcycle Grand Prix races. He currently competes in the IDM Superbike Championship.

Ranseder's first points came at Catalunya in 2005.

Career statistics

Career highlights
2002 - 2nd, ADAC Junior Cup #18 Aprilia RS 125
2003 - 6th, German IDM 125 Championship #18 Honda RS125R
2004 - 1st, German IDM 125 Championship #6 KTM 125 FRR
2005 - 2nd, German IDM 125 Championship #1 KTM 125 FRR
2006 - 31st, 125cc World Championship #9 KTM 125 FRR
2007 - 12th, 125cc World Championship #60 Derbi RS 125 R
2008 - 23rd, 125cc World Championship #60 Aprilia RS 125 R
2009 - 25th, 125cc World Championship #88 Hajoue 125 / Aprilia RS 125 R
2010 - 2nd, German IDM Supersport Championship #18 Yamaha YZF-R6
2011 - 2nd, German IDM Superbike Championship #18 BMW S1000RR
2012 - 2nd, German IDM Superbike Championship #2 BMW S1000RR
2013 - 2nd, German IDM Superbike Championship #18 Honda CBR1000RR
2014 - 12th, German IDM Superbike Championship #18    Honda CBR1000RR

Grand Prix motorcycle racing

By season

Races by year
(key) (Races in bold indicate pole position, races in italics indicate fastest lap)

References

External links 

 Michael Ranseder bio at Yahoo eurosport

1986 births
Austrian motorcycle racers
Living people
125cc World Championship riders
Moto2 World Championship riders